Alpha Horologii (α Horologii) is a solitary orange-hued giant star in the constellation Horologium. It is visible to the naked eye with an apparent visual magnitude of +3.85. The star is moving away from the Sun with a radial velocity of +21.6 km/s.

The stellar classification of K2 III indicates this is an evolved giant star of the K class. This means it has consumed the hydrogen at its core and has migrated away from the main sequence, with its outer envelope cooling and expanding in the process. Alpha Horologii has an estimated 1.55 times the mass of the Sun and is radiating 38 times the Sun's luminosity from its photosphere at an effective temperature of 5,028 K. It has swollen to around 11 times the diameter of the Sun, having spent much of its life as a white main sequence star.

References

Horologium (constellation)
K-type giants
Horologii, Alpha
Durchmusterung objects
026967
1326
019747